WSRM (93.5 FM) is a radio station in Coosa, Georgia, serving the Rome, Georgia area. It is owned by Rome Radio Partners, LLC, and airs a country music format.

External links

SRM (FM)